The UB-tree as proposed by Rudolf Bayer and Volker Markl is a balanced tree for storing and efficiently retrieving multidimensional data. It is basically a B+ tree (information only in the leaves) with records stored according to Z-order, also called Morton order. Z-order is simply calculated by bitwise interlacing the keys.

Insertion, deletion, and point query are done as with ordinary B+ trees. To perform range searches in multidimensional point data, however, an algorithm must be provided for calculating, from a point encountered in the data base, the next Z-value which is in the multidimensional search range.

The original algorithm to solve this key problem was exponential with the dimensionality and thus not feasible ("GetNextZ-address"). A solution to this "crucial part of the UB-tree range query" linear with the z-address bit length has been described later. This method has already been described in an older paper where using Z-order with search trees has first been proposed.

References

Database index techniques
Search trees